The Avon School District is a community public school district that serves students in pre-kindergarten through eighth grade from Avon-by-the-Sea, in Monmouth County, New Jersey, United States.

As of the 2020–21 school year, the district, comprised of one school, had an enrollment of 137 students and 17.7 classroom teachers (on an FTE basis), for a student–teacher ratio of 7.7:1. During the 2016–17 school year, Avon was tied with the 23rd smallest enrollment of any school district in the state, with 158 students.

The district is classified by the New Jersey Department of Education as being in District Factor Group "I", the second-highest of eight groupings. District Factor Groups organize districts statewide to allow comparison by common socioeconomic characteristics of the local districts. From lowest socioeconomic status to highest, the categories are A, B, CD, DE, FG, GH, I and J.

For ninth through twelfth grades, public school students attend either Asbury Park High School or Manasquan High School, as part of a sending/receiving relationships with the respective districts, based on the results of a lottery under which 62.5% of students are sent to Manasquan and 37.5% to Asbury Park. As of the 2020–21 school year, Asbury Park High School had an enrollment of 682 students and 54.5 classroom teachers (on an FTE basis), for a student–teacher ratio of 12.5:1.

The Manasquan school also serves students from Belmar, Brielle, Lake Como, Sea Girt, Spring Lake, Spring Lake Heights who attend as part of sending/receiving relationships with their respective districts. As of the 2020–21 school year, Manasquan High School had an enrollment of 1,006 students and 76.9 classroom teachers (on an FTE basis), for a student–teacher ratio of 13.1:1.

Students may also apply to academy schools in the Monmouth County Vocational School District, which include the Academy of Allied Health & Science, Biotechnology High School, High Technology High School, Marine Academy of Science and Technology and Communications High School. Students also have the option to attend Academy Charter High School in Lake Como, which accepts students on a lottery basis from the communities of Allenhurst, Asbury Park, Avon-by-the-Sea, Belmar, Bradley Beach, Deal, Interlaken and Lake Como.

School
Avon Elementary School serves students in grades PreK-8. The school had an enrollment of 133 students during the 2018–19 school year.

Administration
Core members of the district's administration are:
Christopher Albrizio, Superintendent / Principal
Amy Lerner, Business Administrator / Board Secretary

Board of education
The district's board of education, comprised of seven members, sets policy and oversees the fiscal and educational operation of the district through its administration. As a Type II school district, the board's trustees are elected directly by voters to serve three-year terms of office on a staggered basis, with either two or three seats up for election each year held (since 2012) as part of the November general election. The board appoints a superintendent to oversee the day-to-day operation of the district.

References

External links
Avon Elementary School
 
School Data for the Avon Elementary School, National Center for Education Statistics

Avon-by-the-Sea, New Jersey
New Jersey District Factor Group I
School districts in Monmouth County, New Jersey
Public K–8 schools in New Jersey